In 2015 SA's Got Talent returned for another season. Tatz remained the host. Shado, Lalla and DJ Fresh have remained the judging panel this year.

Changes 
 From this season a golden buzzer was added, which if pressed would send the contestant straight through to the semi-finals.  Each judge can only use the buzzer once.
 The prize was changed from R250 000 to R500 000.

Auditions

Open Auditions

Judges Auditions 
Acts who were accepted in the open auditions, make it through to the judges audition, where it is televised with a live audience.
For the judges auditions, there are 5 episodes where hundreds of acts are put through to have a chance to get to the next round - the semi finals, although only 21 acts will get through.

Semi finals
There are 3 episodes in the semi finals part of this competition. Each episode consists of 7 acts. There are also 3 result episodes in which 2 acts from each episode are put through to the finals.

Semi finalist summary

Semi Final 1 

Result show guest: Tholwana Mohale

Semi Final 2 

Result show guest: Micasa

Semi Final 3 

Result show guest: Tresor

Finals 

6 acts are put through to the finals with 1 winner, ultimately, that wins the grand prize of R500 000.

Result show guest: Toya Delazy

Episode summary

References

Got Talent
2015 South African television seasons